Myb-related protein B is a protein that in humans is encoded by the MYBL2 gene.

Function 

The protein encoded by this gene, a member of the MYB family of transcription factor genes, is a nuclear protein involved in cell cycle progression. The encoded protein is phosphorylated by cyclin A/cyclin-dependent kinase 2 during the S-phase of the cell cycle and possesses both activator and repressor activities. It has been shown to activate the cell division cycle 2, cyclin D1, and insulin-like growth factor-binding protein 5 genes. Transcript variants may exist for this gene, but their full-length natures have not been determined. MYBL2 is deregulated in various cancer types and can contribute to cancer progression.

Interactions 

MYBL2 has been shown to interact with:
 CDK9
 CREB-binding protein
 Cyclin A1
 Cyclin-dependent kinase inhibitor 1C 
 EP300
 PARP1
 Retinoblastoma-like protein 1

References

Further reading

External links 
 

Transcription factors